Bhoomikanya was an Indian TV drama series that was premiered on 30 July 2018 on Star Jalsha. The show portrays a modern adaptation of Rupak Saha's novel Tarita Puran.

Bhoomikanya is the television directorial debut for Arindam Sil The music was composed by Tabla player Bickram Ghosh. The title track is sung by Ujjaini Mukherjee.

Plot 
The story starts off with Tarita, a herpetologist returning home at Sundargarh in Odisha State. This area is the stronghold of Chandrabhanu. He is a local gangster who engages in human trafficking, corruption and illegal abductions. Maheshwar, the chief advisor to Chandrabhanu, prophesies the downfall of Tarita in the beginning of the series. She is assisted in her endeavors by Ankush, a forest ranger who is her love interest. Overall, the unfolding of this gripping tale, delineates the triumph of good over evil.

Cast 
Sohini Sarkar as Tarita
Kaushik Sen as Chandrabhanu
Chiranjeet Chakraborty as Maheshwar
Anirban Bhattacharya as Ankush
Sudipta Chakraborty as Satima
Rupanjana Mitra as Sanaka
Ankita Chakraborty as Netra
Rimjhim Mitra as Ankush's sister-in-law.
Shakuntala Barua as Ankush's Grand-Mother

Crew
Story - Rupak Saha
Producer - Arindam Sil
Dialogue - Padmanava Dasgupta
Camera - Dipyaman Bhattacharya
Editing - Swapan Basu, Jishu Nath
Music Director - Bickram Ghosh
Director - Arindam De
Screenplay - Kausik Bhattacharya
Title Track - Ujjaini Mukherjee
Costume - Abhishek Roy

References 

Bengali-language television programming in India
Star Jalsha original programming
2018 Indian television series debuts
2019 Indian television series endings